Steevy Chong Hue (born 26 January 1990) is a Tahitian footballer who plays as a striker for A.S. Tefana in the Tahitian First Division.

Background

Chong Hue is of Hakka Chinese ancestry from Longgang, Shenzhen, China. The area was formerly known as Bao'an in Shenzhen.

Club career

Chong Hue began his career playing for AS Samine as a teenager before joining A.S. Dragon in the Tahiti First Division in 2010. In 2011, Belgian Third Division side Bleid-Gaume signed Chong Hue and compatriot Alvin Tehau, however they did not make any appearances for the club due to its economic difficulties at the time and decided to return to Tahiti. After his performance in the 2013 FIFA Confederations Cup, he earned much praise and became linked to several professional clubs.

On 26 July 2013, it was confirmed that Chong Hue had joined French Ligue 1 club FC Lorient on a 15-day trial. He played in several pre-season friendly matches for the club.

International career
He has represented Tahiti at both the domestic and international level. Most notably he scored the winning goal in the 2012 OFC Nations Cup final securing the first ever international title for his country. He also took part in Tahiti's campaign in the 2013 FIFA Confederations Cup.

2012 OFC Nations Cup
Steevy Chong Hue was selected in Tahiti's 23-man squad for the 2012 OFC Nations Cup by coach Eddy Etaeta. He scored his first international goal in Tahiti's first game of the tournament against Samoa in the 61st minute. He scored his second international goal in Tahiti's second game of the tournament against New Caledonia, scoring the winner in a 4–3 victory. On 10 June, in the final, he scored the only goal of the game on the 10th minute against New Caledonia, securing Tahiti their first ever international title and qualification for the 2013 FIFA Confederations Cup representing Oceania.

2013 FIFA Confederations Cup
Chong Hue was included in the 23-man Tahiti squad for the 2013 FIFA Confederations Cup. He played in all three games Tahiti played against Nigeria, Spain, and Uruguay. He played well above expectations in the competition especially against Nigeria in which he several times caused problems to the opposition defence, and in particular to the Nigerian right-back Efe Ambrose of whom he often outpaced down the left flank.

International goals
As of match played 29 May 2016. Tahiti score listed first, score column indicates score after each Chong Hue goal.

Honours

Team
A.S. Dragon: 
Tahiti First Division 2011–12, 2012–13

International
OFC Nations Cup: 2012

Individual
2011-12 Tahiti First Division Golden Boot: - 11 goals

References

1990 births
Living people
French Polynesian footballers
French Polynesian expatriate footballers
Tahiti international footballers
Association football forwards
French people of Chinese descent
French Polynesian people of Chinese descent
Hakka sportspeople
People from Bao'an County
Sportspeople of Chinese descent
Expatriate footballers in Belgium
Tahitian expatriate sportspeople in Belgium
Blagnac FC players
2012 OFC Nations Cup players
2013 FIFA Confederations Cup players
2016 OFC Nations Cup players